This was the first edition of the tournament.

Nina Stojanović and You Xiaodi won the inaugural title, defeating Han Xinyun and Zhu Lin in the final, 6–4, 7–6(8–6).

Seeds

Draw

References 
 Draw

ITF Women's Circuit - Shenzhen Longhua - Doubles